Dubonnet  may refer to:
André Dubonnet, French flying ace, sportsman and inventor
Emile Dubonnet, French aviator
Dubonnet, an alcoholic drink
Dubonnet Cup, English football exhibition cup game
Dubonnet suspension A type of independent front suspension for vehicles